ISO 3166-2:BW is the entry for Botswana in ISO 3166-2, part of the ISO 3166 standard published by the International Organization for Standardization (ISO), which defines codes for the names of the principal subdivisions (e.g., provinces or states) of all countries coded in ISO 3166-1.

Currently for Botswana, ISO 3166-2 codes are defined for 10 districts, 4 towns, and 2 cities.

Each code consists of two parts, separated by a hyphen. The second part is two letters.

Current codes
Subdivision names are listed as in the ISO 3166-2 standard published by the ISO 3166 Maintenance Agency (ISO 3166/MA).

Click on the button in the header to sort each column.

Changes
The following changes to the entry have been announced in newsletters by the ISO 3166/MA since the first publication of ISO 3166-2 in 1998:

See also
 Subdivisions of Botswana
 FIPS region codes of Botswana

External links
 ISO Online Browsing Platform: BW
 Districts of Botswana, Statoids.com

2:BW
ISO 3166-2
Botswana geography-related lists